Connector Motorways was an Australian toll road operator which operated the Lane Cove Tunnel and the Falcon Street Gateway (now Military Road E-ramp) in northern Sydney. Both projects opened to the public in March 2007. Connector was owned by CK Infrastructure Holdings (19.6%), AMP (15%) and
Leighton (11%)

Connector Motorways started off as the Lane Cove Tunnel Company and was engaged by Roads & Traffic Authority to design, construct, maintain and operate the tunnel for 33 years on 1 October 2003. Connector Motorways was supposed to operate the tunnel concession until 2037.

On 19 January 2010, Connector Motorways went into receivership when traffic through the tunnel failed to reach the projected volumes. Toll road operator Transurban bought the tunnel in May 2010 for $630 million and became the new operator.

References 

Transport companies of Australia
Toll road operators
Australian companies disestablished in 2010
Australian companies established in 2007
Transport companies disestablished in 2010
Transport companies established in 2007